Coman Goggins is a former Gaelic footballer who played for the Dublin county team, winning an All Star, from the Ballinteer St Johns club. He went to school in Coláiste Eoin, Stillorgan. He is therefore a fluent Irish speaker. 

Coman was the only Dublin player to receive an All-star in 2001, although, this came as a great honour in a year in which Dublin collected no silverware. In the same year he was selected to play Inter-Provincial football for Leinster along with his Dublin team-mate Ciarán Whelan. He was on Dublin’s 2002, 2005 and 2006 Leinster Senior Football title winning sides. Goggins was appointed Captain for Dublin in the 2002 Senior Football Championship by the then new, Dublin Senior Football manager, Tommy Lyons. In 2003, his luck began to change and he was a surprise omission  from the Dublin squad. Surprisingly Dublin forward Collie Moran was selected in his place. He has been in fine form in 2006 particularly during the league campaign where he excelled at centre half back. During the 2006 championship he lined up in his favoured wing back position and played a pivotal role although at times he looked very unsure on the ball. Goggins played in Dublin's last game in the 2006 Championship, an All-Ireland semi-final defeat at the hands of Mayo. Goggins was named on the 2006 Dublin Bus/Evening Herald Blue Star football XV at left half-back. He won the 2007 O'Byrne Cup for Dublin against Laois at O'Connor Park in Offaly. The game finished on a scoreline of 1-18 to 2-13 against Laois.

He announced his retirement from the inter-county scene at the start of the 2008 season. He now works as a GAA analyst for both RTÉ and TG4.

External links
Goggins Retires

Year of birth missing (living people)
Living people
Ballinteer St. Johns Gaelic footballers
Dublin inter-county Gaelic footballers
Gaelic football backs
Gaelic games writers and broadcasters
Irish international rules football players